Utz is a novel written by the British author Bruce Chatwin, first published in 1988. The novel follows the fortunes of Kaspar Utz who lives in Czechoslovakia during the Cold War. Utz is a collector of Meissen porcelain and finds a way to travel outside the Eastern Bloc to acquire new pieces. Whilst in the West, Utz often considers defecting but he would be unable to take his collection with him and so, a prisoner of his collection, he is unable to leave. Utz was shortlisted for the 1988 Booker Prize.

See also
 Utz (film)
 Utz (2009 radio play)

References

1988 British novels
Novels by Bruce Chatwin
Novels set in Czechoslovakia
Jonathan Cape books
British novels adapted into films
Novels set during the Cold War